Riggleman is a surname. Notable people with the surname include:

Denver Riggleman (born 1970), American businessman and politician
Jim Riggleman (born 1952), American baseball manager and coach